Rouko is a department or commune of Bam Province in north-western Burkina Faso. Its capital lies at the town of Rouko. According to the 1996 census the department has a total population of 13,175.

Towns and villages
 Rouko  Kounkoubguin  Pittenga  Raka  Rouko-Foulbé  Rilgo  Silmidougou  Yamané

References

Departments of Burkina Faso
Bam Province